Sargam may refer to:

 Swara, a way of assigning syllables to pitches (solmization) in Indian music
 Sargam (music), singing the notes of a musical composition
 Sargam (1950 film), a 1950 Bollywood family drama film directed by P.L. Santoshi
 Sargam (1979 film), a 1979 film in Hindi by Kasinathuni Vishwanath starring Rishi Kapoor and Jayapradha
 Sargam (1992 film), a 1992 film in Malayalam by Hariharan starring Vineeth, Manoj K. Jayan and Rambha
 Sargam (1995 film), a 1995 film in Urdu by Syed Noor starring Adnan Sami, Zeba Bakhtiar and Nadeem
 Uncle Sargam, a puppet character made by Pakistani puppeteer Farooq Qaiser
 Radio Sargam, a nationwide commercial Hindi FM radio station in Fiji